Adam Stefanović (27 November 1832 – 6 May 1887) was a Serbian lithographer and painter. Together with Pavle Čortanović, he authored illustrations of the Kosovo Cyclus (of Serbian epic poetry).

Life
Stefanović was born in Perlez, Austrian Empire (now Serbia). He was educated at the University of Munich in 1867, and then at the University of Vienna.

He was an associate of Pavle Čortanović. He lived in Pančevo in the 1870s, where he published his lithographs with Čortanović. He is deemed to have been "far better" of an illustrator than his companion.

Work

See also

List of painters from Serbia

References

Sources

1832 births
1887 deaths
People from Zrenjanin
Realist painters
Lithographers
19th-century Serbian painters
Serbian male painters
19th-century lithographers
20th-century Serbian artists
19th-century Serbian male artists
20th-century Serbian male artists